The Virginia / North Carolina Athletic Conference was a short-lived intercollegiate athletic conference that existed from 1920 to 1922. As its name suggests, the league's members were located in the states of North Carolina and Virginia. It is unknown which teams won its football championship during its three seasons in existence.

See also
List of defunct college football conferences

References

Defunct college sports conferences in the United States
College sports in North Carolina
College sports in Virginia